Let's Go Bowling is an American third wave ska band hailing from Fresno, California. Since the band's inception in the year 1986, the band's traditional ska style, barbershop harmonies, wisely crafted instrumentals, and its frantic live performances, helped set the standard for dress and culture for West Coast Ska, which in turn, set the groundwork for the Third Wave Movement in 1995.

Let's Go Bowling has shared the stage with many diverse musical acts, including No Doubt, Pearl Jam, Goo Goo Dolls, Men at Work, The English Beat, Steel Pulse, Busta Rhymes, The Skatalites, Reel Big Fish, Reverend Horton Heat, Fishbone, The Untouchables, Cherry Poppin' Daddies, Tokyo Ska Paradise Orchestra, Moe., the Young Dubliners, and Shaggy.

Biography

Early history  1986 - 1992
It is hard to pinpoint exactly which was the first of the Third Wave Bands to come about in the mid '80s. The clash between who were the "First" remains a topic of controversy to this day, but no one can deny that the roots of US Ska were deep on the West Coast. One such band, Fresno/Kingsburg's Kyber Rifles, was founded by Mark Michel, who on bass, were playing shows and recording EPs as early as 1983. (Norwood Fisher credited Mark as being an influence on his playing in the 1980s.) The Rifles' sound would become instrumental in bridging the gap between LGB's original line-up: guitarist David Molina, keyboardist Darren Fletcher, drummer Jerry Mora, trombonist Mark Berry, alto/tenor saxophonist Martin Stuart, trumpeter Pete Nicholson, toaster Javier Molina, and Michel on bass.  Soon, Mora and Nicholson departed, making way for future frontman/trombonist David Wiens, tenor saxophonist Dean Olmstead, drummer Jason Ellam, and Jason Boyte on trumpet.  This was the nucleus of the Music To Bowl By era of Let's Go Bowling.

Music To Bowl By was recorded for Moon Ska Records in the winter of '89 - winter of '90. This captured the band at its pioneering stage, with emphasis on style and songwriting, unheard of in its current central valley contemporaries. (Fresno is home to some of the most influential Ska outfits of the later century, including Let's Go Bowling, as well as Kyber Rifles, Checkmate, and Los Hooligans). The band blended three-part vocals, infused with a Latin vibe inherent in its frontman/vocalist David Molina, and a pinch of Warner Bros. zaniness. David Weins acted as the MC - as the boisterous trombone playing ruffian.  "Music To Bowl By" is considered to be a Classic in all ska circles and a credit to the genre.

LGB, in support of their album, pressed for then-new label Moon Ska in NY, went out to tour, in support of their record, with labelmates that included The Toasters, Hepcat, Dance Hall Crashers, and the Slackers. Let's Go Bowling got the call to be the opening act for Bad Manners in 1991, which led to them being "the" chosen US opening band by all the original Two Tone acts, including The Specials, and The Selecter. After such success, the band disbanded briefly for a period of time, as members went their separate ways, to pursue other career avenues, leaving the band defunct for 10 months in '92 - '93.

Mr Twist era 1993 - 1997
Mr. Twist was recorded the Summer '95 in Fresno, CA. The band went back to their old catalog, with songs like "Hot Buttered" "Mayhem," and the single "Spy Market," finding new life with a new line-up. The new line-up included drummer Adam Lee (who, with Fletcher in 1994, was briefly a part of Toronto's ska masters, King Apparatus), trumpeter Patrick Bush (a heavy influence on the new LGB sound), M. Rey DeLeon (trombonist prodigy, at the age of 18), Gilbert Lopez on the tenor saxophone, rounding-out the horn section & giving weight to the low end Erik Dvorak playing baritone sax, and guitarist Chris Ridge. This also was the proper introduction of Paul Miskulin, who had replaced David Molina, and now had a forum to contribute his Soul-heavy, blues rhythm guitar to the already potent mix.  This line-up of the band would enjoy the most critical success of the band's career in the Third Wave Explosion of 1996.

On the eve of the release of their second studio album in almost 5 years, LGB was dealt a tragic blow when news that original guitarist, David Molina, had passed.  The band, which included Javier Molina, David's brother, were about embark on a 6-week independent tour of the US.

By the end of the tour and LGB's arrival to its home turf of Fresno, CA, No Doubt's single, "Just A Girl" was breaking the radio airwaves for the first time. Things started to happen fast, and the new band had to act quickly, recruiting a lead guitarist, Lincoln Barr, formerly of the Santa Rosa Ska outfit The Conspiracy. Barr added a much needed edge in the guitar department.

In the summer of 1996, LGB released the single "Spy Market", which the video for was in heavy rotation on the new rock affiliate, MTV2, and was prominently featured on a special for MTV's 120 minutes, entitled "The Third Wave". Along with the Toasters, Let's Go Bowling was then dubbed, on national television, one of the flagship bands of the genre. The energy at the shows, from the audience and the band itself, was at an all-time high.

The band was touring the US as a headliner, whose national prominence had given them greater control over their live shows and opening acts. Ska was exploding in the West where Sublime and No Doubt had become KROQ-FM darlings. The OC, home to Reel Big Fish, Save Ferris, and The Aquabats (with the then unknown Travis Barker on Drums). Let's Go Bowling was the original West Coast ska band, and enjoyed the laurels bestowed upon them by these bands, who had cited Let's Go Bowling as an influence in interviews, and also in record releases (No Doubt thanked LGB in the liner notes of "Tragic Kingdom").

LGB, whose tourmates included The Specials, Bad Manners, and The Selecter, recruited ska/swing auters Cherry Poppin' Daddies and Reel Big Fish for a tour of the US in 1997. It was at this time, that the Ska explosion had opened the door for the Swing Scene, which included the Daddies, who recruited M. Rey DeLeon as a touring Trombonist, and Tom Mattot, who was the LGB soundman since '93, and an Oregon native, as their Front of House Soundman.

Freeway Lanes era 1997 - 1998
With things really going on, Let's Go Bowling released a live record for Asian Man Records (Mike Park's Skankin' Pickle label) entitled Freeway Lanes. This captured the band at its most innovative, with the band performing freely, and capturing golden moments of interaction between the band, and its beloved scene. It is at this time that the band started to become more free form, and detached with the rigidness of its structure, and would routinely stretch out its Skatalite covers into 15 minute episodic affairs.  M.Rey's solos over "Man In The Street" and "The Reburial of Marcus Garvey" were highly innovative in its use of delay to create a ricochet of brass, inspired by Dub music. These solos would extend, and lend themselves to Gilbert Lopez's Tenor Saxophone innuendoes, forming huge, parallel, harmonic ideas, completely improvised, and helped break down the barriers of what could be done within a previously stale, formulatic ska medium. Freeway Lanes includes tributes to LGBs predecessors The Untouchables "Live and Let Dance" and The Equators' "More Than A Person". The album also contains a composition by 20 year old M. Rey DeLeon, entitled "Sock Monkey March", a blistering and ominous march, intended to be a send up of old Esquivel compositions, and an ode to their then manager, Richard "Cord" Burk, who some say resembles a sock monkey in flight.

LGB toured in support of their live record as part of The Spirit of Unity tour, sponsored by Teva. Tourmates included Steel Pulse, Ghetto Youth (the Marley kids), Buju Banton, Beres Hammond, Third World, Lucky Dube and Shaggy.

In 1998, Let's Go Bowling was the support act for 3 major tours including The Reverend Horton Heat, The Wailing Souls and for the reunion tour of Men at Work, playing to packed houses all around the U.S. In August 1998, Lincoln Barr left the band to pursue other efforts closer to home. LGB recruited Fresno-based guitarist/singer Glen Parrish to carry on with the lead guitar/vocal duties.

Stay Tuned era 1999 - 2001
Starting in January 1999, after three years of constant and successful touring across America, Let's Go Bowling took a year off the road to record a studio album for its new label Liberation Records. Under imminent pressure to release a follow up to "Mr Twist" and amidst the great success of their "ska" contemporaries, the band recruited music producer Stoker and, for the first time, turned the artistic reins over to a music pro looking for the commercial success that had eluded the band. Stoker (drummer for Dexys Midnight Runners & General Public, and producer for Hepcat and Ice Cube) took 23 of the band's tour tested new songs and whittled an adventurous 13-song "pop" album called, "Stay Tuned". This album contained diverse contributions from the entire band: Adam Lee providing a healthy dose of new punk infused material "Metal Fingers" "Identity Crises", Patrick Bush lending his Dub sensibilities to the mix "Solar Shock" "Electric Bread", the "radio" pop stylings of Glen Parrish "Fallen Angel" "She's Killing You", and the gritty soul of Paul Miskulin "The Middle" "Saving Sorries". Not to forget Darren Fletcher's classic "Bone Dry", which is considered one of the best tunes the band has ever recorded. But due to polar artistic choices and divergent influences, "Stay Tuned" was far different than the previous two studio efforts, confusing many at the time, and within that confusion, Stay Tuned was released in spring of 2000. The album was met with mixed reviews, and faced harsh criticism from their original "True Tone" fan base. M. Rey DeLeon left the band to pursue his music career in L.A.  With new trombonist Rob Ruffner in tow, the band played one one-month tour in support of the album before calling it quits as a touring group.

Current status
The band still occasionally plays their famous brand of ska for adoring fans across California. LGB still has original members Darren Fletcher(keys/vocals) and Mark Michel(bass/vocals), as well as long-time members Adam Lee (drums), Dean Olmstead (sax), Paul Miskulin (guitar/vocals/harmonica), Glen Parrish (lead guitar/vocals), Robert Ruffner (trombone) and the latest addition of Los Hooligans founder Tony Luna (trumpet).

Band members
Founding members
Mark Berry - trombone (1986–1991, 2008)
Darren Fletcher - keyboards, vocals (1986–present)
Mark Michel - bass guitar, vocals (1986–present)
David Molina - lead guitar (1986–1992) RIP 8/15/69 - 12/28/95
Javier Molina - toasting, antics (1986–1988, 1996)
Jerry Mora - drums (1986–1988)
Pete Nicholson - trumpet (1986–1987)
Martin Stuart - alto sax (1986–1991)

Current members

Darren Fletcher - hammond organ, keyboards, vocals
Adam Lee - drums (1991–present)
Mark Michel - bass guitar, vocals
Paul Miskulin - guitar, harmonica, vocals (1993–present)
Dean Olmstead - tenor sax (1988–1992, 1998–present)
Glen Parrish - guitar, vocals (1998–present)
Robert Ruffner - trombone (1998–present)
Tony Luna - trumpet (2012–present)

Previous members
David Wiens - trombone (1987–1994)
Wallace Harvey - keyboards (1986)
Dan Dorval - trumpet (1987–1988)
Geoff Belau - trombone (1987–1988)
Jason Boyte - trumpet (1988–1992)
Jason Ellam - drums (1988–1992)
Scott Abels - drums (1992)
Gilbert Lopez - tenor sax (1993–1998)
Patrick Bush - trumpet, vocals (1993–2012)
Roman Bellick - bowlingball (2008) Rip
Erik Dvorak - baritone sax (1993–2000)
M. Rey DeLeon - trombone (1995–2000)
Chris Ridge - lead guitar (1995–1996) RIP 3/22/71 - 6/9/08
Lincoln Barr - lead guitar (1996–1998)
Adam Theis - trombone (1998)
Dakota Iyall - sax (1998)

Discography

  Albums  
Let's Go Bowling (9-song cassette, 1988)
Music To Bowl By (CD & cassette, 1991)
"...Does The Spiral LIVE!" (cassette, 1995)
Mr. Twist (CD, 1996)
Freeway Lanes (CD & 12" vinyl, 1998)
Stay Tuned (CD, 1999)

  Singles  
Rude 69 / Dance Some More (7", Single) 	Spare Records 	1988
You Take Me / Uncomfortable Sidekick (7", Single, Ltd, Cle) 	Moon Ska 	1996

  Compilations  
"Bitch"  Various - Ska Face: An All American Ska Compilation  (LP, Comp) Moon Records 1988
"Let's Go Bowling"  Various - Mashin' Up The Nation Best Of U.S. Ska Vol. 1 (LP, Comp) Harvard Square Records 	1988
"Bitch"  Various - Ska-Ville USA Vol. 3  (LP, Comp)  Ska Records 	1988
"Pinstripe Suit"  Various - California Ska-Quake  (CD, Comp)  Moon Ska 	1992
"Esta Noche"  Various - United Colors Of Ska  (CD, Comp)	Pork Pie 	1993
"Hare Tonic"  Various - Max The Dog Says...Do The Ska!  (CD, Comp)  Dojo 	1993
"Badminton On A Rope" (The Ska Parade Theme Song) Various - Step On It: The Best Of The Ska Parade Radio Show  (CD, Comp)	A To Y Productions 	1994
"Let's Go Bowling" Various - Mashin' Up The Nation • The Best Of American Ska Volumes I And II  (3 versions)  DVS Media 	1995
"Mr. Twist" Various - Keep The Pressure On  (CD, Comp)	Kingpin Records  	1996
"Oatmeal For Christmas"  Various - SKAuthentic  (CD, Comp)	Steady Beat Recordings 	1996
"Days All The Same" & "The Cup Rub"  Various - This Are Moon Ska  (CD, Smplr, Promo, Comp)	Moon Ska 	1996
"Spy Market"  Various - Ska Sucks  ◄ (2 versions)	Liberation Records  	1998
"You Take Me" (Live)  Various - Mashin' Up The Nation Best Of American Ska Vols. III & IV Ten Years After  (CD, Comp)	DVS Media 	1998
"Spy Market"  Various - Moon Ska, New York, USA  (CD, Comp)	Moon Ska Europe 	1998
"More Than A Person"  Various - The Ska Parade: Runnin' Naked Thru The Cornfield  (CD, Comp)  A To Y Productions 	1998
"Oatmeal For X-mas"  Various - Mailorder Is Fun!  (CD, Comp)	Asian Man Records 	1998
"Esta Noche"  Various - United Colors Of Ska Volume 1-3  (4xLP, Comp)  Pork Pie 	2000
"Spaced Man!"  Various - Still Standing - A North American Ska Uprising (4xCD, Comp) Jump Up! Records, Megalith Records 	2003

External links
Official Site

Third-wave ska groups
American ska musical groups
Reggae fusion groups
Musical groups from California
Asian Man Records artists